Amal Khalifa Idris Habani (born September 19, 1974) is a Sudanese journalist.

Background and education 
Amal is a freelance journalist and contributor to the Sudanese news outlet Al-Taghyeer. She is the co-founder of the local independent press freedom group Sudanese Journalists Network, based in Khartoum. She has repeatedly been harassed and detained by Sudanese authorities in connection with her coverage of protests and official wrongdoing.

Social work 
Habani is a journalist and a human rights activist. She is the co-founder of the Sudanese women's movement NO for Women Oppression, a social initiative established in 2009 that calls for change in Sudanese laws that discriminate against and target women in Sudan.

Awards 
 Habani received the Human Right Activist Award with the NO for Women Oppression Initiative in 2014 from the EU mission in Sudan.
 Habani has received recognition for her courageous opposition outside of her country: in 2014, Amnesty International awarded her the prestigious Ginetta Sagan Prize.
In 2018 Habani was among the journalists described as "The Guardians" who were named Time Person of the Year in an annual issue of the United States news magazine Time.

Arrests 
Habani as part of her journey to document human rights violations was arrested on 16 January 2018 near Jamhuria Street for being part of a public demonstration addressing the prices of goods and the economic crisis facing Sudan.

Habanni was arrested in 2017 in connection with her coverage of a trial of a human rights organization accused of "publishing false reports".  After refusing to pay the fine and preferring to be jailed Habani was released after a crowdfunding campaign raised the funds. In 2013, she was detained for days in an undisclosed location after she reported critically on the police response to protests in Khartoum.

References

External links 
 Speech for the 2018 International Press Freedom Award

Living people
Sudanese activists
Sudanese women activists
Sudanese journalists
Sudanese women journalists
1974 births